Major-General Philip George Saxon Gregson-Ellis  (31 August 1898 – 20 October 1956) was a senior British Army officer who saw active service during both the First World War and the Second World War, where he commanded the 5th Infantry Division during the Italian Campaign in 1944.

Military career
Born in 1898, Philip Gregson-Ellis was educated Eton College and later entered the Royal Military College, Sandhurst and from there was commissioned as a second lieutenant into the British Army's Grenadier Guards in 1917, towards the end of the First World War.

He remained in the army after the war, and, during the interwar period, attended the Staff College, Camberley from 1928 to 1929 and was appointed an instructor there in 1937.

He served in the Second World War as a General Staff Officer (GSO) with the British Expeditionary Force (BEF) in France before becoming Commanding Officer (CO) of the 2nd Battalion, Grenadier Guards in 1940. He continued his war service as a Brigadier on the staff in Northern Ireland from 1941 and as Deputy Chief of Staff for Home Forces in 1942 before taking command of the 30th Armoured Brigade in January 1943, and then the 1st (Guards) Brigade in July, which was then serving in North Africa. He was appointed General Officer Commanding (GOC) 5th Infantry Division in January 1944 and commanded the division in the Italian Campaign, leading it in the Battle of Anzio and Operation Diadem.

After the war he returned to the Staff College, Camberley, as commandant and then went back to the 5th Division for a second tour as its commander. He was appointed GOC 44th (Home Counties) Infantry Division in 1947 and finally retired from the British Army in 1950.

Family
In 1921 he married Joan Henllys Lloyd.

References

Bibliography

External links
Generals of World War II

|-

|-

|-

1898 births
1956 deaths
British Army generals of World War II
British Army personnel of World War I
Commandants of the Staff College, Camberley
Companions of the Order of the Bath
Deputy Lieutenants of Kent
Graduates of the Royal Military College, Sandhurst
Graduates of the Staff College, Camberley
Grenadier Guards officers
Officers of the Order of the British Empire
People educated at Eton College
Military personnel from Edinburgh
British Army major generals
Academics of the Staff College, Camberley